Eddie Korvin is an American recording engineer, composer and music producer. In 1969, he founded Blue Rock Studio located in downtown Manhattan. Upon opening Blue Rock for business in 1970, after 14 months of design and construction, Korvin served as chief engineer for 10 years and then as supervising engineer until 1986 when Blue Rock was sold. With co-composer Ron Frangipanè, Korvin scored a documentary series, This Was America, which won an Emmy Award for the episode "Hometown."

Early years
Korvin was born and raised in Manhattan. He came from a “theatrical family” as his step father was actor, Charles Korvin. Coincidentally, his birth father was a movie producer, then based in England, known as half of The Danziger Brothers. Family friends and acquaintances in the music field included composers Burton Lane and Johnny Mercer, singer Anita Ellis, conductor Ted Saidenberg, violinist Issac Stern, bass/baritone George London, record store owner, Sam Goody, Arturo Toscanini, and Murray the K.

Blue Rock Studio
Through spending time with Robert Traynor, college friend and booking manager for Electric Circus, Korvin helped with equipment load-in, stage set up and microphone set ups. After producing sessions recorded at Bell Sound and Apostolic Studios with a New York 3-piece electric house band, Sirocco, Korvin decided to assemble all the organizational elements necessary to build an audio recording studio, Blue Rock Studio.

Intentionally conceived as a one-room-only recording facility, Blue Rock Studio offered privacy and intimacy in a creative surrounding. Korvin says, “Blue Rock was a space of learning, a place to acquire and use technical skills and musical knowledge. During each and every recording and mixing session, as an engineer, I always learned something new. As a producer, directing musicians in the studio, it was about setting the groundwork to try to capture those moments of magic."

The Fatback Band, led by drummer Bill Curtis, recorded their first few albums at Blue Rock in the early 70’s. Described in an interview with Ace Records some 40 years after the event: “Right away, Bill booked himself into New York’s Blue Rock studios and within four hours his band laid down 9 tracks. Two hours later, the album 'Lets Do It Again' had been mixed! Bill acknowledges the input of the studio staff; 'The guy responsible for our sound was Eddie Korvin – he was the engineer. He said he never heard a session recorded this way in his life – so he kept it the way we played.'"

Work in television and film
Korvin began composing music commercially around 1980, scoring for projects in film, television and commercials. In 1982, he won an Emmy Award for scoring an episode of the documentary series, “This Was America”. Working with film director David Sutherland, a former classmate at Tufts University, Korvin was composer and assistant director for the award-winning film, Jack Levine: A Feast Of Pure Reason. Other scoring projects included two more films with Sutherland for PBS as well as shows for HBO, Cinemax and an ABC TV Christmas special. Still active today, he has recently worked with director John Alexander as music supervisor on Bender and on Little Satchmo as assistant director, music supervisor, and composer .

References

External links
Discogs listing
HI HEEL SNEAKERS -- Barry Goldberg Demo featuring Bob Dylan (Blue Rock Studio 1971)
Tokyo Express starring the Saturday Night Live Band 1980
La Raza Humana performed by Santa Monica High School Choirs

1945 births
Living people
Tufts University alumni
Dalton School alumni
Sorbonne University
Audio engineers
21st-century American composers
Emmy Award winners